Josua Järvinen (4 February 1871, Orivesi – 28 February 1948) was a Finnish schoolteacher, inspector of schools and politician. He was a member of the Parliament of Finland from 1907 to 1911, representing the Social Democratic Party of Finland (SDP).

References

1871 births
1948 deaths
People from Orivesi
People from Häme Province (Grand Duchy of Finland)
Social Democratic Party of Finland politicians
Members of the Parliament of Finland (1907–08)
Members of the Parliament of Finland (1908–09)
Members of the Parliament of Finland (1909–10)
Members of the Parliament of Finland (1910–11)
Finnish schoolteachers
University of Helsinki alumni